Syaoran (小狼 Xiǎoláng; シャオラン Shaoran) is the given name of three fictional characters created by Clamp:

 Syaoran Li, the male protagonist of Cardcaptor Sakura
 Syaoran (clone), the first protagonist and later antagonist of Tsubasa: Reservoir Chronicle
 Syaoran (original), the second protagonist of Tsubasa: Reservoir Chronicle, and the character from which the first protagonist was cloned